Joshua Gilman Hall (November 5, 1828 – October 31, 1898) was an American politician and a U.S. Representative from New Hampshire.

Early life
Born in Wakefield, Carroll Counthy, New Hampshire, Hall attended Gilmanton Academy, and in 1851 was graduated from Dartmouth College in Hanover. He studied law with Daniel M. Christie and was admitted to the bar in 1855, practicing in Wakefield and Dover, New Hampshire.

Career
Hall served as solicitor of Strafford County, 1862–1874, and as mayor of Dover in 1866 and 1867. He was a member of the New Hampshire Senate in 1871 and 1872, and he served in the New Hampshire House of Representatives in 1874.  He was the United States Attorney for the District of New Hampshire from April 1874 to February 1879.

Elected as a Republican to the Forty-sixth and Forty-seventh Congresses, Hall was United States Representative for the state of New Hampshire from (March 4, 1879 – March 3, 1883). Subsequently, he resumed the practice of law.

Death
Hall died in Dover, Strafford County, New Hampshire on October 31, 1898 (age 69 years, 360 days). He is interred at Pine Hill Cemetery in Dover.

Family life
On November 16, 1861, Hall married S. Lizzie Bigelow and they had three children, Grace, Susan, and Dwight.

References

External links

1828 births
1898 deaths
Dartmouth College alumni
United States Attorneys for the District of New Hampshire
Republican Party members of the New Hampshire House of Representatives
New Hampshire lawyers
Republican Party New Hampshire state senators
People from Dover, New Hampshire
Republican Party members of the United States House of Representatives from New Hampshire
19th-century American politicians
People from Wakefield, New Hampshire
19th-century American lawyers